Krasny Kholm is a rural locality (a selo) in Krasnokholmsky Selsoviet, Kaltasinsky District, Bashkortostan, Russia. The population was 275 as of 2010. There are 6 streets.

Geography 
Krasny Kholm is located 19 km east of Kaltasy (the district's administrative centre) by road. Krasnokholmsky is the nearest rural locality.

References 

Rural localities in Kaltasinsky District